This is a list of accessories released for the Nintendo Entertainment System (known in Japan as the Family Computer, or Famicom) by Nintendo and other various third party manufacturers.

Family Computer 
Since the Famicom lacked traditional game controller ports, third-party controllers were designed for use with the console's expansion slot.

Nintendo Entertainment System

See also 
 History of the Nintendo Entertainment System
 Nintendo Entertainment System hardware clone
 List of Super Nintendo Entertainment System accessories

References 

 
Video game lists by platform